Kenneth Hyman (born December 11, 1928) is an American film producer, best known for The Dirty Dozen (1967). The son of Eliot Hyman, he was head of UK operations for Seven Arts Productions and head of production for Warner Bros.-Seven Arts. While head of Warner Bros.-Seven Arts, among his achievements was hiring black director Gordon Parks for The Learning Tree (1969).

Filmography 
 The Hound of the Baskervilles (1959)
 The Stranglers of Bombay (1959)
 The Terror of the Tongs (1961)
 Gigot (1962)
 What Ever Happened to Baby Jane? (1962)
 The Hill (1965)
 The Dirty Dozen (1967)
 Emperor of the North Pole (1973)

References

External links 
 

American film producers
Living people
1928 births